The Prime Minister of the Imperial Cabinet was a position created on 8 May 1911 during the late Qing dynasty, as part of the imperial government's unsuccessful attempts at creating a constitutional monarchy in China.

History 

In the early 1900s, the Qing government began implementing constitutional reform in China in order to prevent a revolution. The reforms included the Outline of the Imperial Constitution passed in 1908, which ordered that elections for provincial assemblies must be held within a year. In May 1911, the government replaced the Grand Council with a thirteen-member cabinet, led by Prince Qing, who was appointed Prime Minister of the Imperial Cabinet. However, the cabinet included nine Manchus, seven of whom were members of the imperial clan. This "Princes' Cabinet" was unpopular among the people and was viewed as a reactionary measure, being described at one point as "the old Grand Council under the name of a cabinet, autocracy under the name of constitutionalism."

When the Wuchang Uprising broke out in November 1911, the imperial court summoned the general Yuan Shikai to command the Beiyang Army and put down the revolution. He was named Prime Minister on 2 November 1911, shortly after Prince Qing stepped down. He remained in that office until March 1912, when he negotiated with Empress Dowager Longyu the abdication of the Xuantong Emperor.

The post was briefly revived in July 1917 during Zhang Xun's attempt to restore the Qing monarchy, but he only held it for several days before Beijing was retaken by Republican forces.

List of prime ministers

See also 
 Chancellor of the Tang dynasty
 Grand chancellor (China)
 List of premiers of China

References

Further reading 
 

Government of the Qing dynasty
Premiers of China
Lists of political office-holders in China
Reform in China